God Willing is a 2006 Swedish romance film directed by Amir Chamdin. The soundtrack for this film composed by Nathan Larson contains two songs by Nina Persson.

Cast 
Nina Persson - Juli
Amir Chamdin - Juan
Janne "Loffe" Carlsson - David
Hassan Brijany - Giuseppe
Georgi Staykov - Joro
Sunil Munshi - Jean-Claude
Alexander Karim - Mohammed

References

External links 

2000s romance films
Swedish romance films
2000s Swedish-language films
2000s Swedish films